Palakkad Town railway station (code: PGTN) is a railway station that serves city of Palakkad,Kerala and falls under the Palakkad railway division of the Southern Railway zone, Indian Railways. City is served by two railway stations, Palakkad Junction railway station located at Olavakkode, one of the suburbs of the city and Town railway station located at the heart.

Trains

Routes 
(Single electrified BG) –Palakkad Town

(Single diesel BG) Palakkad Town–Pollachi Jn

References

Railway stations in Palakkad district
1904 establishments in India
Railway stations opened in 1904
Transport in Palakkad